Johan Schouten (4 October 1910 – 11 May 1989) was a Dutch wrestler. He competed in the men's Greco-Roman welterweight at the 1948 Summer Olympics.

References

External links
 

1910 births
1989 deaths
Dutch male sport wrestlers
Olympic wrestlers of the Netherlands
Wrestlers at the 1948 Summer Olympics
Sportspeople from Amsterdam